Win Tun is a Burmese chess player. He is the winner of the 2012 Myanmar National Chess Championship, and the 2017 World Amateur Chess Championship (U-2300) class.

References

Living people
1979 births
Burmese chess players
20th-century Burmese people
21st-century Burmese people